A monoblock (or monobloc) LNB is a type of low-noise block downconverter used in communications satellite reception, this multiple combined LNBs is the simplest solution to achieve multifeed reception for two, three or four satellites.

This design consists of two, three or four independent LNBs in a single case. The two, three or four LNBs can be automatically addressed with any DiSEqC 1.0 or higher receiver. In some cases, they can also be addressed with ToneBurst/MiniDiSEqC. However, they are only available for satellites with a fixed 3 degree, 4°, 4.3° or 6° other spacing.

Most receivers which are sold nowadays are compatible with at least DiSeqC 1.0 which allows to switch automatically between 4 satellites (all of contemporary Monoblock LNBs), as user changes channel on remote control.

Availability examples 

In Europe, for example, there are monoblock single, twin and quad LNBs for the Ku band, which have a pre-defined spacing of 6 degrees (for Astra 19.2°E/Hot Bird 13°E).

In March 2007, a new type of monoblock, called the Duo LNB was introduced by CanalDigitaal in the Netherlands for the simultaneous reception of  Astra 19.2°E/Astra 23.5°E with a spacing of just 4.3 degrees. Unlike most other monoblocks, the Duo LNB was intended for use with 60 cm dishes (most monoblocks require a larger, 80 cm or 1 m dish).

The Duo LNB is available in twin and quad versions.
Triple monoblock LNBs are available in single, twin and quad versions.

There are also available triple monoblock LNB units, which enable users to receive signals from three satellites:

for example Hotbird 13°E, Eutelsat 16°E and Astra 19.2°E
or the same can be used for positions: Eutelsat 7°E, Eutelsat 10°E and Hotbird 13°E. This monoblock can be used for other positions with the same spacing (3°+3°=6°spacing).

Other very popular examples for different spacing are: Astra 1: 19.2°E, Astra 3: 23.5°E and Astra 2: 28.2°E (4.3°+4.7°=9°spacing).

And there are also available four feed monoblock LNB units, which enable users to receive signals from four satellites, for example Eurobird 9°E, Hotbird 13°E, Astra 19.2°E and Astra 23.5°E (4°+6.2°+4.3°=14.5°spacing).

Multiband Monoblock 

There are also existing Monoblock LNB to combine Ku-band LNBs with one of alternative band LNBs.
Available bands are:
Ka band that is: Ka-band LNBs or 
C band that is: C-band LNBs

Multiple Monoblock on one and the same dish 

Two monoblock LNB can be put on the same dish using: Multi-satellite technique.
However the result of such placing may be far from optimal. It may result in low level signal from some or all of satellites, but it can work in geographical favorable locations.
Such monoblock LNBs can be connected by adding DiSEqC switch with compatibility of cascading, or they can be connected directly to different satellite tuners. Especially twin tuner with two separate inputs.
However placing several separate single feed LNBs can lead to better results: more optimal signal levels.

Possibility of developments 

Current DiSEqC technology could allow to build monoblock LNB for even 16 (64 when cascading) satellites positions, but limiting factors are:
market demands, and popularization of narrow directional beams among TV stations broadcasters who does not really want too broad audiences despite much better relative carbon footprint in this case.

Other limiting factor is that for monoblock for 16 satellites positions special shape of antenna dish should be used, and that also limits markets possibility.

Using DiSEqC 1.1  7-8 satellites positions from 24° spacing could be addressed and received with a lot of success by standard size and shape dish in some densely populated parts of globe.

The cheapest way would be to expand triple feed 3° monoblock design to encompass additional satellite positions as there are plenty of 3° separated satellites.

The greatest problem is to design thin 2°,1°or 0.5° monoblock. If that obstacle could be cheaply omitted there would be no limit to design large matrix of multiple LNBs into monoblock LNB.

Another limiting factor is low awareness by general population and satellite reception users of Multi Feed Multi satellite, and the fact that it is so easily possible.
That awareness is further crippled by the fact that DiSEqC and therefore Monoblock is not compatible with satellite channel router (SCR) or unicable LNBs in a single cable distribution.
So users needs to decide among using multiple receivers through single cable distribution with single unicable LNB or using Multi Feed Multi-satellite reception by Monoblock LNB in twin and quad versions but with two or four cables leaded and plugged to each of receivers for multiroom experience.

A lot of general population in a lot of countries does not know even that Free To Air satellite or even terrestrial broadcast exist and are sticking with paid cable TV providers out of convenience.
A state that is highly promoted by paid TV. (It is not that it is possible to promote non awareness but paid satellite reception is heavily promoted by itself in contrast to scarcity of information repeatedly available about Free To Air)

See also
Duo LNB
USALS = Universal Satellites Automatic Location System
DiSEqC = Digital Satellite Equipment Control
SAT>IP end user consumer equipment that can switch different ip streams from different SAT>IP servers and facilitates selection of reception from different satellites
Motor-driven Satellite dish
Automatic Tracking Satellite Dish
Astra 1: 19.2°E
Astra 3: 23.5°E
Astra 2: 28.2°E
Hotbird 13°E
Eutelsat
Eurobird

References

Telecommunications equipment
Consumer electronics
Satellite broadcasting
Radio frequency antenna types
Antennas (radio)

cs:Low-noise block converter#Monoblock LNB
de:Rauscharmer Signalumsetzer#Monoblock-LNB
fr:Tête universelle#Alternatives en Europe
pl:Konwerter satelitarny#Konwerter Monoblock